The Night Call Tour was the third concert tour by English synth-pop singer Olly Alexander, under the stage name Years & Years and was his first tour as a solo artist. The tour supported the Night Call album and began on 19 May 2022 at the Brighton Centre and concluded on 12 November in Melbourne, Australia.

Background
On 18 March 2021, Years & Years, then a band featuring Olly Alexander, Emre Türkman and Mikey Goldsworthy, announced their split, with Alexander stating that the trio had "grown apart musically". Alexander subsequently revealed that the band would instead become a solo project and that he would be releasing new music later in the year.

The Night Call Tour was announced on 29 October 2021 ahead of the release of the album of same name, which was released on 7 January 2022. On 22 March 2022, Alexander revealed via Instagram that Cat Burns, L Devine, Queer House Party and Eddy Luna would be supporting the UK and Ireland dates. Alexander was due to headline the Colourboxx Festival at Glasgow's Bellahouston Park on 25 June 2022, with Becky Hill, Bimini Bon-Boulash and Sugababes also on the bill however, the festival was later announced to have been cancelled.

In an interview with Hits Radio, Alexander said of the tour: "If anybody managed to catch a little bit of my New Year's Eve show, that was like a little taster of what the show is going to be. So I'm at the moment getting it together, but it’s going to be a very queer, very fun, party vibe. I just want to give the people the best night of their life. That's all I want". Discussing the tour with tge Evening Standard, Alexander explained that "my big inspiration for the tour was the movie Showgirls; especially the iconic scene towards the end where there’s lava onstage and they’re all in gold lamé and it’s just insane" and also highlighted 1971's Pink Narcissus and Bob Fosse's 1972 Cabaret films as major inspirations. Alexander collaborated with visual artist Theo Adams for the show's staging, stating that "Theo’s vision is super visceral and dirty, and a bit of a twisted take on a night out. We have toilet cubicles on stage! As far as bang for your buck, a toilet goes a long way. Visually they have a strong place in queer history as a place of hook-ups, love, lust and shame, as well as being this bodily space that we’re slightly repulsed by". The costumes for the tour were designed by Rory Parnell Mooney and Alexander also consulted with a magician in order to be able to execute an illusion that takes place during "Up in Flames".

On 6 April 2022, it was announced that Years & Years would headline the rescheduled Summer Camp Festival, Australia's first touring Pride festival in November.

Setlist
This set list is representative of the show on 19 May 2022, in Brighton. It is not representative of all concerts for the duration of the tour.

"Night Call"
"Sweet Talker"
"Consequences"
"Sooner or Later"
"Shine"
"Muscle"
"Play"
"Sunlight"
"Sanctify"
"Worship/Rendezvous"
"Desire"
"Hallucination"
"Up in Flames"
"Here"
"20 Minutes"
"Eyes Shut"
"It's a Sin" (Pet Shop Boys cover)
"Crave"
"Starstruck"
Encore
 "If You're Over Me"
"King"

Critical response
Reviewing the Wembley Arena show, Sam Rice of the Evening Standard stated that "solo suits the band's frontman, who kept the crowd in the palm of his hand". In his four star review, Rice praised Alexander's playfulness on stage, explaining that "The BAFTA-nominated, chart-topping renaissance man gave a slick performance on this London date of his Night Call tour - but with the humour and impish charm of someone who clearly still knows how to have fun" and highlighted that "even when dipping into songs from Years and Years’ previous two albums, the set was almost entirely roof-raising pop-synth and disco bangers". Rice summarized that "Alexander’s show was a triumphant showcase of the power of pop to liberate, titillate and be buckets full of fun".

At the UK tour's closing show at the AO Arena, Nicole Wooton-Cane of Manchester Evening News noted that "Alexander had the crowd hooked from the start as him and his dancers somehow turned grotty British telephone boxes into a stage that sold his vision of a gritty yet sexy after hours world" and praised the show's visuals and set design. She acknowledged that, owing to it being the final show, Alexander's "voice struggled slightly to keep up with the intense and impressive choreography but he was such a captivating performer that this hardly even mattered - he clearly felt every word he sung". Wooton-Cane singled out the stripped down section of the setlist, which featured Alexander and his backing singers performing at a piano, as the show's most memorable moment, describing how "the crowd waved their phone torches and cheered Alexander on as he made his way through a tearful rendition of Eyes Shut, stopping occasionally as he became overwhelmed by emotion. It was a touching addition to the show that brought me to tears and filled the room with a thousand voices singing of heartbreak and strength. Despite the 21,000 strong venue, you felt a human side to Alexander that was intimate and moving". She concluded that "Alexander's unlimited energy and impressive performance was matched by the gripping visuals that might've dominated a less commanding performer - but the two blended together seamlessly to make an enthralling experience".

Alexander reported that he had experienced some criticism from a small number of audience members who claimed that the show was not family-friendly enough and responded that "there’s never been anything explicit or gratuitous about a Years & Years show, so yeah, I find the reaction to be quite interesting", comparing it to a similar reaction that he received during his BBC New Year's show.

Tour dates

Notes

Cancelled shows

Notes

Personnel
Years & Years
Olly Alexander - lead vocals, piano

Band
Mikey Goldsworthy - synthesisers, keyboard, bass guitar
Paris Jeffree - drums
Joell Fender - backing vocals
Yasmin Green - backing vocals
Tehillah Daniel - backing vocals

Dancers
Kibrea Carmichael
Max Cookward
Jamie Graham
Sarah Li Baugstø
Artemis Stamouli

References

2022 concert tours